Allen Island is an uninhabited island in the Qikiqtaaluk Region of Nunavut, Canada. It is a Baffin Island offshore island located in Cornelius Grinnell Bay. It is east of Hall Peninsula and is separated from Beekman Peninsula on the west by Smith Channel.

References

External links 
 Allen Island in the Atlas of Canada - Toporama; Natural Resources Canada

Islands of Baffin Island
Uninhabited islands of Qikiqtaaluk Region